Hans Roosipuu (2 April 1931 Torma Parish, Tartu County – 8 July 2017) was an Estonian sport film director and cinematographer.

1961 he graduated from Gerasimov Institute of Cinematography. 1953-1957 he was a photographer at the newspaper Edasi. 1959-1991 he was cinematographer and director at Tallinnfilm.

Filmography
 Ülekanne 56 : 13 (1969)
 Kümnevõistlejad (1971)
 Pentathlon moderne (1974, co-author)
 Korvpallikohtuniku metoodika (1976)
 Optimistid (1976, co-author)
 100 m selili kammerorkestri saatel (1978)
 Tennis (educational film, 1978)
 Heerosed (olympic winners Aavo Pikkuus, Ivar Stukolkin, Jaak Uudmäe and Viljar Loor; 1980)
 Oo, sport, sa oled rahu (1981)
 Küljetuul (1983)
 Liikumine ja lapsed (1985)
 Imetegija võlg (Riho Suun; 1987, co-author)
 Eesti partii (Paul Keres; 1991)
 Imet püüdmas (family Šmigun; 1996, co-author)
 Tempo di valse (Indrek Pertelson; 1999)
 Tiim (Mati Alaver and his team; 2006, co-author)

References

1931 births
2017 deaths
Estonian film directors
Estonian cinematographers
Estonian photographers
Estonian photojournalists
People from Jõgeva Parish
Burials at Pärnamäe Cemetery